The Transport Select Committee is a select committee of the House of Commons in the Parliament of the United Kingdom. The remit of the committee is to examine the expenditure, administration and policy of the Department for Transport and its associated public bodies.

Membership

Members as of February 2023, are as follows:

Source: Transport Committee

Changes since 2019

2017-2019 Parliament
The election of the chair took place on 12 July 2017, with the members of the committee being announced on 11 September 2017.

Changes 2017-2019

2015-2017 Parliament
The chair was elected on 18 June 2015, with members being announced on 8 July 2015.

Changes 2015-2017

2010-2015 Parliament
The chair was elected on 10 June 2010, with members being announced on 12 July 2010.

Changes 2010-2015

See also
List of Committees of the United Kingdom Parliament

References

External links
Transport Committee
Records for this Committee are held at the Parliamentary Archives

Select Committees of the British House of Commons